Business in Vancouver (BIV) is a weekly business news journal co-founded in 1989 by Peter Ladner in Vancouver, British Columbia, Canada. Published on Tuesdays it receives about 62,000 readers per week.

Its operations include the biv.com website, a portfolio of nearly two dozen annual business magazines, an extensive roster of special events, a daily radio program on Roundhouse Radio 98.3 FM Vancouver, a weekly podcast, and video production.

Its publisher is the Business in Vancouver Media Group, a division of Glacier Media.

Among its special events, BIV manages an annual Forty Under 40 Awards program for the province's outstanding young entrepreneurs. It also manages the Influential Women in Business Awards related to senior executives in the private and public sectors.

Authors include Nelson Bennett, Glen Korstrom,  Kirk LaPointe, Tyler Orton, Hayley Woodin and several commentators including Jock Finlayson, Peter Ladner, Gabriel Yiu,
and others.

In 2011 and 2013, its publications won the Jack Webster Foundation Business, Industry & Economics Awards.

The magazine's sections are:
Agriculture
Asia-Pacific
Commentary
Economy
Entertainment
Environment & Sustainability
Forestry & Fisheries
Hospitality & Tourism
Human Resources
Law & Politics
Media & Marketing
Mining & Energy
Real Estate
Retail & Manufacturing
Sports & Leisure
Technology
Transportation

In February 2016, BIV listed Metro Vancouver attraction places ranked by number of visitors:
 Grouse Mountain
 Vancouver Aquarium
 Capilano Suspension Bridge Park
 Richmond Olympic Oval
 Science World

For the 2017 provincial election, BIV hosted an all-party debate including Green Party leader Andrew Weaver, Liberal Andrew Wilkinson and NDP Carole James.

References

1989 establishments in British Columbia
Magazines established in 1989
Magazines published in Vancouver
Economy of Vancouver
Business magazines published in Canada
Glacier Media